The Jack Rabbit Trading Post  is a convenience store and curio shop located on former U.S. Route 66, five miles west of Joseph City, Arizona city limits off of Exit 269 on Interstate 40.

Description
It was founded in 1949, on the site of either a Santa Fe Railroad building or a former snake farm, depending on the source, and became famous for a series of billboards that stretched from Missouri to Arizona, each bearing the silhouette of a jackrabbit and the distance from that sign to the trading post. In front of the store was another such billboard with "HERE IT IS" written underneath it. The billboards were part of a collaboration between the original owner, James Taylor, and Wayne Troutner, who owned the For Men Only store in Winslow, Arizona.

With a large fiberglass jackrabbit that can be mounted (for pictures), the facility is considered a major Route 66 attraction.

In the 2006 film Cars, the trading post's "HERE IT IS" signage is depicted with a Model T Ford in place of the jackrabbit and "Lizzie" (a 1923 Ford) as the store's proprietor. The end credits included a thank you to Antonio and Cindy Jaquez, who have owned the trading post since 1995. 

On Route 66 in Staunton, Illinois, Henry's Rabbit Ranch uses very similar signage with the slogan "HARE IT IS."

Gallery

References

External links

 

Buildings and structures on U.S. Route 66
Retail buildings in Arizona
Buildings and structures in Navajo County, Arizona
Tourist attractions along U.S. Route 66
Tourist attractions in Navajo County, Arizona